Acmaeodera acuta is a species of metallic wood-boring beetle in the family Buprestidae. It is found in the western United States and Mexico. Its larval host is likely Salix and adults hosts include Achillea, Encelia, Rosa, Salix, and Sphaeralcea. The species is fairly restricted to riparian habitats.

A. acuta is often confused with A. retifera in collections.

References

Further reading

 
 
 

acuta
Articles created by Qbugbot
Beetles described in 1860